The surname Yermoshin (feminine: Yermoshina) is derived from the fiven name Yermosha, a diminutive for Yermolay. Notable people with the surname include:

Lidia Yermoshina (born 1953), Belarusian politician
Vladimir Yermoshin (born 1942), Belarusian politician

Russian-language surnames